Wolframin is a protein that in humans is encoded by the WFS1 gene.

Function

This gene encodes a transmembrane protein, which is located primarily in the endoplasmic reticulum and ubiquitously expressed with highest levels in brain, pancreas, heart, and insulinoma beta-cell lines. Wolframin appears to function as a cation-selective ion channel.

Clinical significance

Mutations in this gene are associated with Wolfram syndrome, also called DIDMOAD (Diabetes Insipidus, Diabetes Mellitus, Optic Atrophy, and Deafness), an autosomal recessive disorder. The disease is characterized by non-immune insulin-dependent diabetes mellitus and bilateral progressive optic atrophy, usually presenting in childhood or early adult life. Diverse neurologic symptoms, including a predisposition to psychiatric illness, may also be associated with this disorder. A large number and variety of mutations in this gene, particularly in exon 8, can be associated with this syndrome. Mutations in this gene can also cause autosomal dominant deafness 6 (DFNA6), also known as DFNA14 or DFNA38.

Mutations in this gene have also been associated with congenital cataracts.

References

Further reading

External links
 GeneReviews/NCBI/NIH/UW entry on WFS1-Related Disorders